The Liga ASOBAL 2011–12 was the 22nd season since its establishment. Barcelona Intersport are the defending champions. The campaign began on Friday, 9 September 2011. The last matchday was played on Saturday, 2 June 2012. A total of 16 teams contested the league, 14 of which had already contested in the 2010–11 season, and two of which were promoted from the División de Plata 2010–11.

Barcelona Borges won their eleventh ASOBAL title.

Promotion and relegation 
Teams promoted from 2010–11 División de Plata
Academia Octavio
Obearagón Huesca
Helvetia Anaitasuna

Teams relegated to 2011–12 División de Plata
Alcobendas
Toledo

Teams dissolved
JD Arrate

Teams

League table 

 Cuatro Rayas Valladolid declined to play in EHF Cup due to financial reasons.
 San Antonio gave up to play in Liga ASOBAL due to financial reasons.
 Torrevieja gave up to play in Liga ASOBAL due to financial reasons.
 Alser Puerto Sagunto, although was finished in 16th position on standings and was relegated, their status as Liga ASOBAL team was re-established due to vacant seats.

Statistics

Top goalscorers
Full goalscorers list

Top goalkeepers
Full goalkeepers list

See also
División de Plata de Balonmano 2011–12

References

External links
Standings
Liga ASOBAL

Liga ASOBAL seasons
1
Spa